Lach is an American musician.

Lach may also refer to:
 Lach (name), a surname
 Lach dialects or Lachian dialects, a group of Silesian dialects

See also 
 Lache
 Lachs
 Lachy Sądeckie
 Lakh, a unit in the Indian numbering system
 Lech (disambiguation)
 Loch (disambiguation)